Madirakshi Mundle is an Indian television actress. She has made her acting debut with 2015 Telugu film Ori Devudoy where she played the lead role Amrutha. She made her television debut as Sita in Siya Ke Ram. In 2019, she was seen in Star Bharat's Jag Janani Maa Vaishno Devi - Kahani Mata Rani Ki as Lakshmi.

Filmography

Films

Television

References

21st-century Indian actresses
Indian television actresses
Actresses from Pune
Living people
Year of birth missing (living people)